No Hope, No Fear is the third album by Borghesia, released in 1987 on Play It Again Sam Records. Album No Hope, No Fear inspired the title of a radio show dedicated to the music from Yugoslavia on Canadian radio station CFMU.

Track listing
"Ni Upanja, Ni Strahu - No Hope, No Fear" – 4:30
"Na Smrtno Kazen - Sentenced To Death" – 5:15
"133" – 4:15
"Blato - Mud" – 5:16
"Lovci - Hunters" – 3:19
"Mi smo Povsod - We Are Everywhere" – 5:41

External links
No Hope No Fear on Discogs

1987 albums
Borghesia albums